The Istanbul Medical Chamber is a medical association in Istanbul, Turkey. Founded in 1929, it is an affiliate of the Turkish Medical Association.

References

External links
 Istanbul Medical Chamber

Trade unions in Turkey
Organizations established in 1929
1929 establishments in Turkey
Organizations based in Istanbul
Medical and health organizations based in Turkey